Clarence "Clarrie" MacKinnon is a former Canadian politician, who represented the constituency of Pictou East in the Nova Scotia House of Assembly from 2006 to 2013. He was a member of the Nova Scotia New Democratic Party.

MacKinnon has a Bachelor of Arts in political science from Mount Saint Vincent University, and a Master of Marine Management from Dalhousie University. He has started part-time work on a PhD from the University of Cardiff in Wales, UK in Earth, Oceans and Planetary Science. MacKinnon has been employed in news media, public relations, and in the fishing industry. He has been a roughneck, worked on a woods crew and sold shoes and mobile homes.

The 2006 provincial election was MacKinnon's first successful run for provincial office.  In a very close race, he won the seat with 36.73% of the vote, defeating his nearest opponent by 107 votes.

Prior to June 2009, MacKinnon was the New Democratic Caucus' critic for Economic Development.

References

Mount Saint Vincent University alumni
Dalhousie University alumni
Nova Scotia New Democratic Party MLAs
Living people
People from Pictou County
1945 births
21st-century Canadian politicians